Gérard Oury (born Max-Gérard Houry Tannenbaum; 29 April 1919 – 20 July 2006) was a French film director, actor and writer.

Life and career
Max-Gérard Houry-Tannenbaum was the only son of Serge Tannenbaum, a violinist of Russian-Jewish origin, and French Jewish Marcelle Houry, a journalist and art critic. Tannenbaum was absent from the life of Oury and he was raised in an unobservant house of his mother and maternal grandmother Berthe Goldner. Oury studied at the Lycée Janson de Sailly and then at the National Conservatory of Dramatic Art. He became a member of the Comédie-Française  before World War II, but fled with all his  family (mother, grandmother and unofficial wife, actress ) to Switzerland to escape the anti-Jewish persecutions by the Vichy government. When in 1942 his daughter Danielle Thompson was born, his fatherhood was concealed, to avoid her classification as a Jew.

After 1945 he returned to the liberated Paris and restarted his career as an actor, performing in the theatre and in supporting roles in the cinema. Oury became a movie director in 1959 and gained his first success in 1961 with Crime Does Not Pay (Le crime ne paie pas).

Pairing André Bourvil and Louis de Funès as a comic duo, he burst into commercial filmmaking with 1965's The Sucker (Le corniaud). The film was entered into the 4th Moscow International Film Festival. The following year, Don't Look Now... We're Being Shot At! (La Grande Vadrouille) was even more successful, attracting the largest audiences ever in France (17.27 million admissions). This box-office record stood for decades, only surpassed in 1997 by Titanic from James Cameron.

Oury shot the 1969 comedy Le Cerveau (The Brain) in English, starring David Niven in the lead role as a criminal mastermind.

With actress Jacqueline Roman, he was the father of French writer Danièle Thompson and grandfather of actor/writer Christopher Thompson. He lived together with the French actress Michèle Morgan for the second half of his life.  He died aged 87 in Saint-Tropez on 20 July 2006.

Filmography

References

External links

 
  Gérard Oury at UniFrance Films

1919 births
2006 deaths
French male film actors
French male stage actors
French film directors
French male screenwriters
20th-century French screenwriters
20th-century French Jews
French people of Russian-Jewish descent
Burials at Montparnasse Cemetery
Lycée Janson-de-Sailly alumni
20th-century French male actors
21st-century French male actors
Troupe of the Comédie-Française
French National Academy of Dramatic Arts alumni
César Honorary Award recipients
20th-century French male writers